Ortnice is a small settlement west of Buče in the Municipality of Kozje in eastern Slovenia. The Kozje area is part of the historical Styria region and is included in the Savinja Statistical Region.

References

External links
Ortnice on Geopedia

Populated places in the Municipality of Kozje